The Shadow First Secretary of State is a position in the United Kingdom's Shadow Cabinet that was created on 11 May 2015 by the Leader of the Opposition, Harriet Harman for her interim shadow cabinet. From 2005 to 2010, the office was known as Senior Member of the Shadow Cabinet, and from 2010 to 2015, the office was known as Shadow Deputy Prime Minister of the United Kingdom.

Even though the role has no specific responsibilities attached to it, the holder of the position shadows the First Secretary of State and deputises for the Leader of the Opposition in Prime Minister's Questions when the First Secretary is deputising for the Prime Minister. The current office-holder is Deputy Labour Leader Angela Rayner, who succeeded Emily Thornberry in April 2020. After Dominic Raab was appointed Deputy Prime Minister in September 2021, Rayner does not have an official counterpart in HM Government to shadow, though she continues to shadow Raab in his role as Deputy Prime Minister.

List of Shadow Ministers and Secretaries

See also
 Official Opposition frontbench
 Shadow Cabinet of Keir Starmer
 Shadow Chancellor of the Duchy of Lancaster
 Shadow Minister for the Cabinet Office

References

Official Opposition (United Kingdom)
2005 establishments in the United Kingdom